Rotterdam School of Management, Erasmus University (or RSM) is the international business school of the Erasmus University Rotterdam located in Rotterdam, Netherlands. RSM offers undergraduate and postgraduate programmes taught mostly in English, including MBA, executive education, and PhD programmes.

Rotterdam School of Management, Erasmus University is ranked among the best business schools in Europe, while ranked 1st worldwide according to the 2021 Shanghai Global Ranking of Academic Subjects in the category Business Administration. RSM is also a member of the Partnership in International Management (PIM) network, and hosts a diverse international student body. In 2013, RSM became part of the Alliance of European and Chinese Business Schools, which is under the patronage of the European Federation of Management Development.

History

Erasmus University

The roots of RSM stretch back to the founding of Erasmus University as the Dutch School of Higher Commercial Education in 1913. Originally a business-oriented institution, the Dutch School of Higher Commercial Education was a private initiative established with the support of the Rotterdam business community.

In 1966 Erasmus University (then the Netherlands Institute for Economic Science), commissioned an investigation into the feasibility of founding a Graduate School of Management dedicated to the subject of business administration. The result, inaugurated in 1969, was the ‘Interfaculteit Bedrijfskunde/Graduate School of Management’, a joint initiative of the schools of economics, law and social sciences of Erasmus University, and the schools of civil, mechanical and maritime engineering and general sciences at the Delft University of Technology.

Graduate School of Management

Rotterdam School of Management, Erasmus University first opened its doors in 1970 in the suburb of Kralingen, Rotterdam. The first 30 students began classes in the two-year ‘post-kandidaats’ programme (equivalent to a master's). The school became the first in the Netherlands to offer the degree “Doctorandus in de Bedrijfskunde” post-kandidaats, for students with a university qualification in a non-business discipline.

In 1972 the school moved to new premises in Delft and was once again remodelled, this time as the Interuniversities Institute for Business Administration (‘Interuniversitair Instituut Bedrijfskunde’ or IIB). It had only one division, the ‘Interuniversitaire Interfaculteit Bedrijfskunde/Graduate School of Management Delft’. In November that year the first 29 students graduated with the new academic degree ‘Doctorandus in de Bedrijfskunde’ (Drs.), and the Alumni Association VIB, the ‘Vereniging van afgestudeerden van de Interfaculteit Bedrijfskunde’ was formally established.

Internationalisation
In 1975 the curriculum was revised and, from 1977 onwards, the focus turned towards the internationalisation of the school. The first exchange programme was established in 1980 with the French Institut Supérieur des Affaires, visited by IIB-students Hans van der Laan and Rino Schreuder. The second exchange programme was established with the Wharton School of the University of Pennsylvania in 1986. The number of English-language modules with an international focus expanded. In 1984 the four-year ‘doctorandus’ programme was launched. The first European CEMS master's degree was conferred in 1991, a result of RSM's membership in the renowned CEMS network.

In 1986 the Graduate School of Management Delft moved back to the premises of Erasmus University, and was renamed the Faculty of Business Administration. The doctoral programme was established in the same year. In 1993 the ERASM research school was founded, bringing together researchers from the Faculty of Business Administration and the School of Economics. It is known today as the Erasmus Research Institute of Management (ERIM).

In 2000 the BSc International Business Administration programme (IBA) was established, an English-language bachelor (undergraduate) programme which aims to provide a truly international learning experience with a large proportion of students from outside the Netherlands.

Foundation for Business Administration (Stichting Bedrijfskunde) 
In 1966 a consensus on the lack of suitable training and higher educational facilities for managers in the Netherlands spurred Dutch-based multinationals including Royal Dutch Shell, Unilever and Philips to establish the Foundation for Business Administration (Stichting Bedrijfskunde), which was attached to the Netherlands University of Economics at Rotterdam. This started out as an institute for postgraduate management education, and later became Rotterdam School of Management (RSM).

The founders of RSM each donated two million guilders and included:
 Royal Dutch Shell
 Algemene Kunstzijde Unie
 Koninklijke Zout/Ketjen (Akzo Nobel)
 Amsterdam-Rotterdam Bank
 Algemene Bank Nederland (ABN AMRO)
 Unilever
 Philips Gloeilampen fabriek
 Koninklijke Hoogovens en Staalfabrieken (Tata Steel Europe)

Rotterdam School of Management, Erasmus University
In 1985 Rotterdam School of Management launched its International Full-time MBA programme, initially offered in both Dutch and English. 
In 1986 the ‘post-kandidaats’ IMSEC exchange programme was absorbed into the MBA, and a new IMScEC ‘doctorandus’ programme was launched.

In 2003 RSM joined four schools located in three continents to create the "Global Executive OneMBA".

In 2004 Rotterdam School of Management merged with Erasmus University's Faculty of Business Administration and the Erasmus Research Institute of Management to become Rotterdam School of Management, Erasmus University (RSM).

In 2006 the MSc General Management programme was established, a new master's degree for non-business graduates, now called the MScBA Master in Management.

In 2011 the school appointed Professor Steef van de Velde as dean, who was re-appointed for a second term in 2015.

In 2015 RSM opened an office in Chengdu, China. The RSM China office offers services to prospective students, partners, and alumni as well as maintains relationships with research universities and business schools.

In 2019 the school appointed Professor Ansgar Richter as dean.

Academics

Admissions
The admission procedure varies for bachelor and master programmes. Bachelor programme in International Business Administration at RSM was the most popular and among the most competitive programmes in the Netherlands, receiving  2,605 foreign student and 767 Dutch student applications for the 550 available places in 2018. The admission to the programme are mostly based on previous academic performance as well as CV and motivation.

For the master admission candidates are selected based on sufficient background in bachelor studies as well as academic performance, GMAT results and English proficiency.

Rankings

According to the  Financial Times, QS and Forbes; RSM is ranked as follows:

Programmes

Bachelor programmes
 BSc in Business Administration / Bedrijfskunde (in Dutch)
 BSc in International Business Administration (IBA)

Master programmes
 MScBA in Management
 MScBA in Management (Part time)
 MScBA in Accounting & Financial Management
 MScBA in Business Analytics & Management
 MSc in Business Information Management
 MSc in Finance & Investments
 MSc in Global Business and Sustainability (formerly Global Business and Stakeholder Management)
 MSc in Human Resource Management
 MSc in International Management / CEMS
 MSc in Management of Innovation
 ERIM Research Master in Business and Management
 MSc in Marketing Management
 MSc in Organisational Change & Consulting
 MSc in Strategic Management
 MSc in Supply Chain Management

Pre-master programmes
 Pre-master Business Administration / Bedrijfskunde (Dutch)
 Pre-master Business Administration (English)

MBA programmes
 International Full-time MBA
 Executive MBA
 Global Executive MBA
 Cologne-Rotterdam Executive MBA (in cooperation with University of Cologne)

Research programmes
 ERIM Research Master in Business and Management
 PhD in Management

Executive Master programmes
 MSc in Corporate Communication
 Full-time MBA, Executive MBA and Global Executive OneMBA
 MSc in Maritime Economics & Logistics
 MSc in Customs and Supply Chain Compliance

Customised programmes
Through RSM's customised programmes, employees can access the latest in business and management thinking while engaging with some of the world's most influential thought leaders. These programmes are designed for each client by a team of expert consultants, and can be delivered in-house.

Open programmes
Led by internationally recognised academic and business experts, RSM's current portfolio of open programmes includes:
 General Management 
 Leadership & People Development
 Finance & Accounting
 Strategy
 Marketing and Sales
 Management of Technology, Innovation and Sustainability
 Corporate Communication

Student life
RSM's study association STAR is Europe's largest student ruled study association, with more than 6,500 members. STAR's committees include Consultancy Castle, RSM STAR Case Club, Erasmus Recruitment Days, Management Week, and others. Additionally, there are numerous student clubs at RSM. The focus is on specific business areas as well as event organization.

In 1985, students of the RSM faculty founded the study association 'RSM Student Representation' (SR). The goal of SR is to voice student feedback toward the faculty personnel. SR strives for improving the education of the RSM via this way. SR has about 80 volunteers working for them, coordinated by a board of 7 board members.

International partner schools
RSM students can take part in study exchanges with other leading business schools around the world.

Partner schools include :
In the USA: University of Chicago, New York University, Ross School of Business, Northwestern University, University of California, Berkeley, University of California, Los Angeles, Duke University, Emory University, UNC Kenan–Flagler Business School, University of Illinois at Urbana–Champaign, Marshall School of Business, McCombs School of Business, Kelley School of Business, Cornell University Samuel Curtis Johnson Graduate School of Management.
In Canada: HEC Montréal, McGill University, University of British Columbia, University of Toronto, Schulich School of Business, Queen's School of Business, Darla Moore School of Business.
In Asia: National University of Singapore, University of Hong Kong, Seoul National University, Yonsei University, Korea University, KAIST College of Business, Hong Kong University of Science and Technology, Peking University, Tsinghua University, Indian Institute of Management Ahmedabad, Management Development Institute, The Chinese University of Hong Kong, Shanghai Jiao Tong University,  Keio University, Singapore Management University, National Taiwan University, Universitas Gadjah Mada.
In Europe: HEC Paris, ESCP Business School, London School of Economics, Copenhagen Business School, SDA Bocconi School of Management, ESADE, Universität St. Gallen, WHU – Otto Beisheim School of Management, University of Warwick, Manchester Business School, BI Norwegian Business School, University College Dublin, IE Business School, Grenoble École de Management, Vienna University of Economics and Business, Stockholm School of Economics, IESE Business School, University of Economics, Prague, University of Cologne, Sciences Po Paris.
In Latin America: Universidad Torcuato di Tella, Fundação Getúlio Vargas, Pontificia Universidad Católica de Chile, Instituto Tecnológico Autónomo de México, Instituto Tecnologico de Estudios Superiores Monterrey.
In Oceania: The University of Melbourne, University of Sydney, University of New South Wales, University of Otago

Distinguished alumni
Notable alumni of Rotterdam School of Management are awarded each year in the Distinguished Alumni Awards.

See also
 Erasmus University Rotterdam
 STAR Study Association at Rotterdam School of Management, Erasmus University
 Erasmus Research Institute of Management (ERIM)
 CEMS

References

External links
Rotterdam School of Management, Erasmus University Website
RSM on Financial Times Top 10 European Business Schools Rankings
RSM on Financial Times Top 10 Masters in Management Rankings
RSM on Financial Times Global MBA Rankings
I WILL website

Business schools in the Netherlands
Erasmus University Rotterdam
1966 establishments in the Netherlands
Educational institutions established in 1966